The 1948–49 Tercera División was the 13th edition of the Spanish national third tier.

Format 
14 clubs in 6 geographic groups (84 clubs) participated. One, Maestranza Aérea León withdrew mid-season.  The 6 group champions and 6-runners up were promoted as of right. The 6 group champions played off for the Tercera División championship. The 6 third placed teams and the two bottom Segunda División teams played-off for two places in the Segunda División. In the event the play-offs were unnecessary since Segunda División was expanded from one division of 14 clubs to two divisions of 16 clubs for season 1949–50. No teams were relegated from Segunda División and the top 3 in all 6 groups were promoted.

Regular season

Group 1

Group 2

Group 3

Group 4

Group 5

Group 6

Tercera División Fase Final

 Albacete was champion of Tercera División.

Segunda División promotion/relegation phase

Group I

This phase was canceled for the expansion of the Segunda División, all teams promoted.

Group II

This phase was canceled for the expansion of the Segunda División, all teams promoted.

External links
 Official LFP Site
 Research by Asociación para la Recopilación de Estadísticas del Fútbol (AREFE)

Tercera División seasons
3
Spain